The String Quintet in C major, Op. 29, written by Ludwig van Beethoven, was composed in 1801. This work is scored for string quartet and an extra viola (two violins, two violas, and cello). The Op. 29 is Beethoven's only full-scale, original composition in the string quintet genre; of his other quintet works, the Op. 4 is an extensively reworked arrangement of the earlier Octet for Winds, Op. 103, the String Quintet Op. 104 is an arrangement of an earlier piano trio, and the later fugue is a short work.

The composer dedicated this work to Count Moritz von Fries, a patron to whom Beethoven also dedicated two other works of the same year—the Violin Sonatas No. 4 and No. 5—as well as his later Seventh Symphony.

Movements
Allegro moderato
Adagio molto espressivo
Scherzo. Allegro
Presto

Influence
This quintet allegedly inspired Schubert to write his own string quintet in the same key (his scoring involves two cellos rather than two violas as in Beethoven's quintet).

References

External links 
  
 Performance by the Musicians from Marlboro from the Isabella Stewart Gardner Museum in MP3 format

 029
1801 compositions
Compositions in C major
Music dedicated to nobility or royalty